Robert Ryan (1923 – 25 October 2009) was an English professional rugby league footballer who played in the 1940s and 1950s.

Playing career

International honours
Ryan won caps for England while at Warrington in 1950 against France, in 1952 against Other Nationalities, and won caps for Great Britain while at Warrington on the 1950 Great Britain Lions tour against Australia, and New Zealand (2 matches), in 1951 against New Zealand, and in 1952 against Australia.

Championship final appearances
Ryan played right-, i.e. number 12, in Warrington's 15–5 victory over Bradford Northern in the Championship Final during the 1947–48 season at Maine Road, Manchester.

Challenge Cup Final appearances
Ryan played  in Warrington's 4–4 draw with Halifax in the 1953–54 Challenge Cup Final during the 1953–54 season at Wembley Stadium, London on Saturday 24 April 1954, in front of a crowd of 81,841, and played  in the 8–4 victory over Halifax in the 1953–54 Challenge Cup Final replay during the 1953–54 season at Odsal Stadium, Bradford on Wednesday 5 May 1954, in front of a record crowd of 102,575 or more.

County Cup Final appearances
Ryan played right-, i.e. number 12, in Warrington's 5–28 defeat by Wigan in the 1950–51 Lancashire County Cup Final during the 1950–51 season at Station Road, Swinton on Saturday 4 November 1950.

Club career
Ryan made his début for Warrington on Saturday, 6 October 1945, and he played his last match for Warrington on Saturday, 8 March 1958.

Honoured at Warrington Wolves
Bob Ryan is a Warrington Wolves Hall of Fame inductee.

References

External links
(archived by web.archive.org) Britain hold out Kiwis at Odsal
RL legend dies after long illness
Bob Ryan funeral on Monday
Statistics at wolvesplayers.thisiswarrington.co.uk

1923 births
2009 deaths
England national rugby league team players
English rugby league players
Great Britain national rugby league team players
Lancashire rugby league team players
Rugby league players from Wigan
Rugby league locks
Rugby league second-rows
Warrington Wolves players